Justa may refer to:

 Justa (rebel), also known as Justasa, Samaritan rebel
 JUSTA, Yugoslav airline company from the 1940s
A name attributed to the gentile, Syro-Phoenician or Canaanite woman whose daughter was healed by Jesus according to Mark 7:24-30
Saint Justa of Cagliari (d. 130) - see Justa, Justina and Henedina
Saint Justa (3rd century) - see Justa and Rufina
Justa Grata Honoria
Santa Justa (disambiguation), multiple uses

See also
Justa stove
Justus
Justina (disambiguation)
Justas, a Lithuanian masculine given name